Woodend is a historic home located in the Montgomery County, Maryland, town of Chevy Chase.  This Georgian Revival house was built by Chester and Marion Wells in 1927–1928, and owned by the Audubon Naturalist Society of the Central Atlantic States.  It is a -story house with Flemish bond brick walls and brick quoins. The house was designed by John Russell Pope.

The society maintains the Woodend Nature Sanctuary on the  property, which is open to the public.

It was listed on the National Register of Historic Places in 1980.

References

External links
Audubon Naturalist Society
Woodend Sanctuary & Mansion
, including photo in 1986, at Maryland Historical Trust website

Chevy Chase (CDP), Maryland
Houses on the National Register of Historic Places in Maryland
Houses completed in 1928
Houses in Montgomery County, Maryland
Georgian Revival architecture in Maryland
Colonial Revival architecture in Maryland
John Russell Pope buildings
Nature reserves in Maryland
Protected areas of Montgomery County, Maryland
Nature centers in Maryland
National Register of Historic Places in Montgomery County, Maryland